Fearless (Taylor's Version) is the first re-recorded album by American singer-songwriter Taylor Swift, released on April 9, 2021, through Republic Records. It is a re-recording of Swift's second studio album, Fearless (2008), and the first in the series of six re-recorded albums Swift has planned to release, following the dispute regarding ownership of the masters to her first six studio albums.

Consisting of re-recorded versions of all of the 19 tracks from the Platinum Edition (2009) of Fearless, Swift's 2010 soundtrack single "Today Was a Fairytale", and six bonus "from the Vault" songs that were withheld from being included on the original Fearless or its Platinum Edition, there are 26 tracks on Fearless (Taylor's Version), twelve of which were solely written by Swift. Recreating the album musically, the re-recorded tracks were produced by Swift and Christopher Rowe, using the same touring band that played the instruments on the original, whereas the newly added tracks were produced by Swift, Jack Antonoff and Aaron Dessner. Colbie Caillat returned to feature on "Breathe", while Maren Morris and Keith Urban contributed guest vocals on vault tracks "You All Over Me" and "That's When", respectively.

The album was preceded by three of its songs, all of which entered the top 10 of the Billboard Hot Country Songs chart: "Love Story (Taylor's Version)" topped the chart, "You All Over Me" landed at number six, followed by "Mr. Perfectly Fine" reaching number two. Fearless (Taylor's Version) received critical acclaim, with reviewers praising the precise replication of the original compositions, crisper production quality, nostalgic sentiment and Swift's strong, matured vocals. Commercially, it topped the charts in Argentina, Australia, Canada, Ireland, New Zealand, Scotland, the United Kingdom, as well as the United States, where it marked the first ever re-recorded album to reach number one on the Billboard 200 chart, spending two weeks at the top, and became the second best-selling country record of 2021, behind its successor Red (Taylor's Version).

Background

Taylor Swift released her second studio album, Fearless, on November 11, 2008, to critical and commercial success. It was distributed by American record label Big Machine. The country pop effort spent 11 weeks atop the US Billboard 200 chart and became the best-selling album of 2009. It spawned five top-10 entries on the Billboard Hot 100, including the crossover singles "Love Story" and "You Belong with Me", and catapulted Swift to mainstream prominence. The most awarded country album in history, Fearless won four Grammy Awards at the 52nd ceremony, including Album of the Year, the first of Swift's three wins in that category. The album was certified Diamond by the Recording Industry Association of America, and is credited for paving Swift's way to becoming one of the biggest acts of her generation.

In 2018, after Swift recorded six studio albums under Big Machine, her contract with the label expired. She signed a new contract with record label Republic Records, which is a division of Universal Music Group. In 2019, Big Machine Records was acquired by American talent manager and businessman Scooter Braun and his company Ithaca Holdings. As part of the acquisition, ownership of the masters to Swift's first six studio albums, including Fearless, transferred to Braun. As Braun used to work with Kanye West, Swift's nemesis at times, she was devastated by this news. The master is the first recording of an audio recording, from which copies are made for sales and distribution; the owner of the master, therefore, owns all copies, such as digital versions for download or on streaming platforms, or physical versions available on CDs and vinyl records. In August 2019, Swift denounced the purchase, and announced her intention to re-record her first six studio albums so as to own their masters. In November 2020, Braun sold the masters to Shamrock Holdings, an American private equity firm owned by the Disney estate,  under the terms of acquisition that Braun and Ithaca Holdings will continue to benefit from the albums financially.

Music and lyrics 

The standard edition of Fearless (Taylor's Version) is one hour and 46 minutes long, consisting of 26 songs, the last six of which are noted as "from the Vault" tracks. The deluxe edition adds an extra track, "Love Story (Elvira remix)". The album features guest appearances from American singers Colbie Caillat and Maren Morris, and New Zealand singer Keith Urban, on "Breathe", You All Over Me", and "That's When", respectively. 12 of the tracks on Fearless (Taylor's Version) were written solely by Swift; the rest credits Liz Rose, Hillary Lindsey, Scooter Carusoe, John Rich, the Warren Brothers, and Tommy Lee James as co-writers. Cary Barlowe and Nathan Barlowe, members of American band Luna Halo, are also credited as songwriters on "Untouchable", which is a cover of the band's song. The album was produced by Swift, Christopher Rowe, Jack Antonoff and Aaron Dessner, the first two of which produced the majority, while the latter two, who co-produced Swift's 2020 albums Folklore and Evermore, were involved with the vault tracks only.

Swift told People that she did not significantly alter the lyrical content, vocal melodies and instrumental arrangements of the 2008 recording. However, the sonic textures were changed in the re-recording. She added that she studied Fearless thoroughly to replicate the country inflections of her early vocals. Swift recruited members of her older touring band, who played the instruments on the 2008 recording, to do the same for Fearless (Taylor's Version).

Composition 
In comparison to the 2008 version, there are no lyrical alterations on the re-recorded album, except for a few, minor, grammatical changes. The lyrics explore the beginning of Swift's adolescence, teenage romance, infatuations, and heartbreaks, including themes of empowerment and familial love. Rain is a recurring motif found in the album's lyricism. Replicating the former sonically as well, Fearless (Taylor's Version) is a country and country pop record with pop rock tendencies, making use of the original keys, tempos (except for “The Best Day” which is slightly faster), vocal styles, such as the twang, vibrato and grain, and traditional instruments like guitar, drums, banjo, fiddle and strings. However, reviewers from The New York Times wrote that her singing voice is stronger, more controlled, and deeper in the re-recorded album, discarding the nasal tone of her early vocals. Clash critic Lucy Harbron opined that Swift's vocals have evolved "into her own unique blend of country, pop and indie".

Despite Swift's intention to replicate the original sound, Fearless (Taylor's Version) contains "slight audible differences" in the production and vocals, according to Paula Clare Harper, assistant professor of musicology at the Glenn Korff School of Music at University of Nebraska-Lincoln. According to Harper's digital analysis of the album, Swift performs "signature aspects" of country music in many of its tracks, but in a "breathy, more chest-driven" vocal delivery, a singing style seen in her albums post 2008's Fearless.

Songs "From the Vault" 
Tracks 21 through 26 are branded as "From the Vault", which are songs that did not make the final cut of Fearless (2008). "You All Over Me" is an acoustic country pop song with soaring fiddles, lilting guitars, harmonica, pulsing synth drums, hushed percussions, and Morris' backing vocals. Lyrically, the track details not being able to get over a former lover, while trying to find acceptance and peace. Driven by energetic guitars and drums, "Mr. Perfectly Fine" is a midtempo country pop and pop rock song with elements of rock and rock and roll. Its lyrics find Swift navigating the tumultuous feelings ensued post-breakup, using witty wordplay. The song contains the line "Mr. casually cruel", which has been associated with Swift's 2012 song "All Too Well".

The slow-paced "We Were Happy" is about reminiscing over the highest points of a derailed relationship. Its minimal instrumentals incorporate strings, a chiming guitar riff and lush harmonies. "That's When" is a duet with Urban, marking Swift's second collaboration with him, after "Highway Don't Care" (2012). The song is about two past lovers reuniting. It is a "woozy" country-pop tune with euphoric layered vocals, giddy harmonies, and 1989-style production. In the sparse "Don't You", the narrator runs into a former lover, and pines for their past relationship. Its production incorporates keyboards, electric guitars, and drums layered over each other. "Bye Bye Baby", originally titled "One Thing", was an unreleased track that had existed in the internet for a long time. Swift re-recorded the song for Fearless (Taylor's Version) and changed its title. The song concludes the album with a notion of "Bye, bye, to everything I thought was on my side", a possible reference to Swift's masters dispute.

Marketing and release 

Swift announced Fearless (Taylor's Version) and the lead single "Love Story (Taylor's Version)" on February 11, 2021. Fearless (Taylor's Version) contains 26 songs, consisting of all the tracks from Fearless: Platinum Edition (2009), "Today Was a Fairytale"—the 2010 single from the soundtrack of Valentine's Day (2010), and six new bonus tracks "from the vault" that did not make the 2008 album. The album was one of the most anticipated releases of 2021. "Love Story (Taylor's Version)" topped the Billboard Hot Country Songs chart, giving Swift her eighth number-one single and first ever number-one debut on the chart. It was her first number-one on the chart since "We Are Never Ever Getting Back Together" (2012), and made her the second artist in history to top the chart with the original and re-recorded versions of the same song, after Dolly Parton with "I Will Always Love You".

One of the vault tracks, "You All Over Me" featuring Maren Morris, was released as a promotional single on March 25, 2021. The second single, another vault track—"Mr. Perfectly Fine"—was released with surprise on April 7, 2021, alongside its lyric video. "You All Over Me" reached number six on the Hot Country Songs chart, while "Mr. Perfectly Fine" reached number two.

On April 2, 2021, Swift teased the titles of the vault tracks through an animated clip containing scrambled anagrams. The next day, after the fans decoded the titles, she revealed the full track listing of the album, which included a collaboration with Australian country singer Keith Urban on the vault track "That's When". Urban confirmed the involvement of Swift's longtime collaborator Jack Antonoff in the production of the vault tracks, tweeting the same day that "Jack Antonoff and Aaron Dessner asked if I'd join their band and I said hell yes!". Subsequently, Swift tweeted "I was [Urban's] opening act during the Fearless album era and his music has inspired me endlessly… I'm counting down the minutes til we can all jump into this brave world together, filled with equal parts nostalgia and brand newness". American singer-songwriter Colbie Caillat, who was featured on 2008's "Breathe", re-recorded her vocals for the album.

Swift teased snippets of six tracks off of the album prior to its release. She teased "Breathe (Taylor's Version)" on Tumblr, "Hey Stephen (Taylor's Version)" on Twitter, as well as "Fearless (Taylor's Version)" on Good Morning America and "Fifteen (Taylor's Version)" on Snapchat. She additionally recruited Olivia Rodrigo and Conan Gray to share snippets of "You Belong with Me (Taylor's Version)" and "White Horse (Taylor's Version)" on TikTok and Instagram. Writing that "it's hard to imagine any other star engaging in an act of business retribution while also making it seem so joyful and so participatory for her fans", The New York Times opined that Swift's promotional roll-out leading to the album, incorporating teasers and easter eggs, is a "communal and celebratory experience".

Fearless (Taylor's Version) was released on April 9, 2021. The standard physical copies were made available for pre-order on Swift's website, and CDs with collectible posters available for pre-order exclusively at Target. The vinyl LPs came in two editions, one golden in color and the other red; the latter available on Swift's website and the other at Target. Swift appeared on The Late Show with Stephen Colbert on April 13, 2021. Swift released four compilation chapters, Fearless (Taylor's Version): The Halfway Out the Door Chapter, Fearless (Taylor's Version): The Kissing in the Rain Chapter, Fearless (Taylor's Version): The I Remember What You Said Last Night Chapter, and Fearless (Taylor's Version): The From the Vault Chapter on May 13, May 19, May 24, and May 26, 2021, respectively. On September 20, 2021, limited-edition CDs of the album, autographed by Swift, were made exclusively available on her webstore for 72 hours only.

Critical reception 

Fearless (Taylor's Version) was met with acclaim from music critics, most of whom found the album's diaristic lyrics highly efficient to-date. On Metacritic, which assigns a normalized score out of 100 to ratings from publications, the album received a weighted mean score of 82 based on 17 reviews, indicating "universal acclaim".

The Daily Telegraphs Neil McCormick wrote Fearless (Taylor's Version) is "an exceptionally fine album of country-pop songs" that detail Swift's "romantic fixations" when she was entering adulthood. He felt her vocals have a "fuller" tone and timbre, but still sounded like her 18-year-old self, preserving her "light country twang". Writing for i, Sarah Carson said Fearless proved "prophetic" and "timeless", chronicling universal themes of "breakups, dreams, frustrations, first kisses". She highlighted the "from the Vault" tracks for showcasing Swift's maturity. The Independents Alexandra Pollard praised the album's nostalgia, faithfulness to the 2008 record, and the addition of "oddly comforting" vault tracks. Saloni Gajjar of The A.V. Club opined that Fearless (Taylor's Version) showcased Swift's mature vocals and "sharp sense of musicianship and instrumentation", describing it as a "mellifluous upgrade to an already remarkable album".

Will Hodgkinson of The Times said Fearless (Taylor's Version) is "a masterclass in classic Nashville songwriting", a "sweet, nostalgic" and "wholesome" record that documents Swift's coming of age. Alexis Petridis of The Guardian wrote that it emanates "wistful reminiscence about female adolescence", with "a brilliant fixing of the understandable teenage impulse to mythologise the recent past, to carry on as if it's ancient history". NME critic Hannah Mylrea stated the album "celebrates and stays true to Swift's Fearless era", with warmer and crisper production. Jonathan Bernstein of Rolling Stone appreciated Swift's "richer, deeper" vocals, which he felt embodied "her earlier country affectations". He said her vocals mimicked "the polished Nashville textures and soundscapes" of the original album, and that it is placed lower in the mix. Spin Bobby Olivier called the album a "thrilling timewarp" and a "compelling revisitation" with the same rigor given to all of Swift's projects. He praised the "meticulous replication" of the production.

Variety critic Chris Willman also praised Swift's recreation of the album, and her sonic experimentation on the vault tracks, saying: "What they say about actors 'disappearing into the role'? That really applies to Taylor Swift, playing herself." Clash writer Lucy Harbron complimented its fresh sound and Swift's strong, relaxed vocals; she remarked the original substance retained in the album, "to not uproot these songs' place in people's lives", but enhancing the texture, which results in a "bittersweet magic that has millions feel nostalgic". Ross Horton, writing for The Line of Best Fit, called Fearless (Taylor's Version) "a treasure chest of riches" that breathed "new life into a vital piece of her early work", re-introducing it to a new generation of fans. Gigwise Kelsey Barnes said that "no one has penned songs about teenhood better than Taylor Swift", and that the album offers listeners the opportunity to look back on their  "exaggerated" and "melodramatic" teenage experiences. Barnes picked "Change" and "We Were Happy" as standouts. In a mixed review, Mikael Wood of Los Angeles Times felt that the vault tracks lacked "the trademark specificity that defines Swift's A-game", and downplayed the re-recording as "bare-knuckled capitalism". Critics from The New York Times upheld it as a fight for artists' rights and industrial ethics.

Awards and nominations 
Swift pulled Fearless (Taylor’s Version) from contending for Grammy Awards and Country Music Association (CMA) Awards. On July 20, 2021, a Republic Records representative explained to Billboard that Swift will not submit the album to any of the categories, since "Fearless has already won four Grammys including album of the year, as well as the CMA Award for album of the year in 2009/2010 and remains the most awarded country album of all time." Nevertheless, Fearless (Taylor's Version) was nominated for Top Country Album at the 2022 Billboard Music Awards, alongside Red (Taylor's Version) in the same category; the latter won the award.

Commercial performance 
Fearless (Taylor's Version) garnered the biggest opening day for a female artist's album on Spotify in 2021, tallying more than 50 million global streams in its first day on the platform. Its tracks claimed the top ten spots of Apple Music's global country songs chart. As per Universal Music, the album earned over 1 million units in its first week globally. Fourteen of its tracks charted on the Billboard Global 200 chart, with 8 inside the top 100. At the end of the year, Swift was the most streamed woman on Spotify in 2021, and the second most streamed act behind Puerto Rican rapper Bad Bunny. The International Federation of the Phonographic Industry (IFPI) reported that Swift was the world's best selling soloist and female artist of 2021, for a third consecutive year.

United States 
Fearless (Taylor's Version) debuted atop the Billboard 200, yielding Swift's ninth album to do so. It moved 291,000 album-equivalent units in its first week, of which 179,000 were album sales and 109,000 units from streaming. Billboard remarked the album did not need to sell a single copy to reach number one due its impressive performance on streaming platforms; its streaming tally alone was adequate to top the chart, as its closest competitor, DMX's The Best of DMX (2010), shifted a total sum of 77,000 units only. Fearless (Taylor's Version) is also the eighth longest album to top the chart in the 21st-century, clocking at 106 minutes and 20 seconds, and the longest by a female artist. It spent two non-consecutive weeks at number one.

The album garnered the biggest sales week of 2021, surpassing Morgan Wallen's Dangerous: The Double Album; this record was later broken by Swift's own Evermore (2020) when it resurged in sales after its vinyl release. Fearless (Taylor's Version) garnered the biggest weekly streams ever for a country album by a female artist, the biggest opening week for a country album since Luke Bryan's Kill the Lights (2015), and is also the first ever re-recorded album to reach number one in the US. With Folklore, Evermore, and Fearless (Taylor's Version), Swift became the first female artist to have three number-one albums in less than a year, breaking the previous record held by Donna Summer. The four-month gap between Evermore and Fearless (Taylor's Version) broke Swift's own record for the shortest gap between number-one albums by a woman.

On the Billboard Top Country Albums, Fearless (Taylor's Version) earned Swift her sixth number one, her first since Red (2012). Eighteen of the album's tracks charted on the Hot Country Songs chart, the most ever in a week by a woman, besting her own record of 12 entries from Red. Nine tracks charted simultaneously on the all-genre Billboard Hot 100 chart dated April 24, 2021, extending Swift's record for the most Hot 100 entries by women (136). Aided by Fearless (Taylor's Version), Swift returned to the top of the Billboard Artist 100 chart for a record-extending 47th week.

Following the release of its vinyl LPs and signed CDs, Fearless (Taylor's Version) rose 156 spots and returned to number one on the Billboard 200, earning 152,000 units, of which 67,000 were vinyl sales and 77,000 CD sales; its leap to number one is the largest jump to the spot since the Notorious B.I.G.'s Life After Death ascended 176 spots on the chart dated April 12, 1997, while the 67,000 tally marked the fourth largest vinyl sales week in the MRC Data history, behind Evermore, Olivia Rodrigo's Sour (2021), and Billie Eilish's Happier Than Ever (2021). Fearless (Taylor's Version) was the fifth best-selling album of 2021 with 521,000 sales.

Other markets 
Fearless (Taylor's Version) debuted atop Australia's ARIA Albums Chart as Swift's eighth number-one album in the country. It made her the female artist with the second-most number-one albums (behind Madonna with 11), and the artist with the second-most consecutive chart-toppers (behind Eminem with nine). Swift was the first artist to top the Australian albums chart with three different albums in a 12-month period. The 17-week gap between Evermore and Fearless (Taylor's Version) broke the record for fewest weeks between two different ARIA number-one albums, that Swift previously set with Folklore and Evermore (20 weeks). Fearless (Taylor's Version) topped the Australian Vinyl Albums chart, and the New Zealand Albums Chart as well.

The album launched at number one on the Billboard Canadian Albums chart, marking Swift's ninth chart-topping album in Canada. Sixteen tracks from the album charted simultaneously on the Canadian Hot 100 chart, increasing Swift's career entries on the chart to a total of 148. Fearless (Taylor's Version) was Canada's second best-selling country album by a female artist, behind Swift's own Red (Taylor's Version).

In China, Fearless (Taylor's Version) sold more than 205,000 copies on digital music platforms in less than five minutes, and topped the charts of all major Chinese music streaming platforms, such as QQ Music and NetEase Music.

In the United Kingdom, the album arrived at number one on the UK Albums Chart, marking Swift's seventh chart-topping album. Swift is the only female artist with so many number-one albums in the UK in the 21st-century, with the third-most in history, after Madonna (12) and Kylie Minogue (8). The album surpassed the peak of its 2008 counterpart, and broke the Beatles' 54-year-old record for the fastest accumulation of three number one albums. The band achieved the feat in 364 days between 1965 and 1966, whereas Swift eclipsed it in 259 days. Fearless (Taylor's Version) reached number one on the UK Apple Music chart as well, making Swift the first female country artist to top it. It spent two weeks atop the UK's Official Country Albums Chart. As of May 2021, Swift is the best-selling artist of 2021 in the UK.

Swift scored her sixth number-one album on Ireland's Albums Chart with Fearless (Taylor's Version), outpeaking the original record, which peaked at number seven in 2009. Swift also extended her record as the woman with the most chart-topping albums in Ireland this millennium. The album debuted inside the top-10 in many other European markets, such as Belgium, Denmark, the Netherlands, and Spain. In territories where the sales performance of the re-recording was combined with the original, Fearless reached new peaks bolstered by Fearless (Taylor's Version). Having initially peaked at number 14 on Austrian Albums Chart dated May 29, 2009, the album reached a new peak of number two in the week dated April 23, 2021. In Germany, it re-entered at number two on Offizielle Top 100 dated April 16, 2021, besting its older peak of number 12. It rose to newer peaks of numbers two and three on Norway's Topp 40 Albums and Switzerland's Hitparade Albums Top 100 charts, from numbers five and 35, respectively.

Impact 
Fearless (2008) was charting at number 157 on the Billboard 200 before the release of Fearless (Taylor's Version), after which the 2008 album dropped 19% in sales and fell off the chart entirely, while the re-recording rose to number one. Ben Sisario of The New York Times commented that Fearless (Taylor's Version) has "accomplished what appeared to be one of Swift's goals: burying the original Fearless." Variety contributor Chris Willman underlined the critical and commercial success of Fearless (Taylor's Version) and stated Swift's highly publicized move to reclaim her masters would inspire other artists to "further deputize or weaponize fans in their own business disputes", unlike the less successful attempts by her contemporaries to own their music.

Evening Standard said that Swift, "one of few artists with the power and profile to create change in the music world", stressed "the importance of artists owning their work and refusing to let others capitalize on their creativity", and motivates less established musicians to fight for better record deals. Belfast Telegraph praised Swift for "turning bad blood with Scooter Braun into a revolution for female artists" and credited Swift for encouraging female musicians like Sky Ferreira and Halsey to speak about their struggles in the music industry.  Clash wrote Fearless (Taylor's Version) increased awareness of contracts that exploit young artists, which had become a part of Swift's musical legacy.

The New Yorker asserted the term "Taylor's Version" Swift used for the re-recorded album is "a stroke of strategic genius". Junkee opinioned the move is "a big precedent to set for an industry that doesn't protect its artists very well". Stereogum said that it could "set a new trend in motion" and influence other artists to re-record their past work. According to The Wall Street Journal, if Swift wants to allow a song from Fearless for use in a commercial or a movie, she can sign the deal herself as she owns the masters for Fearless (Taylor's Version), excluding the owners of the original version. Marie Claire called Fearless (Taylor's Version) "monumental" for not only its statement on artists' rights, but for "divorcing [Swift's] music from the sexist media narrative that followed her during her adolescence, inviting listeners and critics to engage with the same songs today without as much gender bias", thus letting Swift take charge of her narrative by eschewing the "tabloid frenzy" and "allowing her musical prowess to take center stage."

Billboard reported that Swift was the highest earning musician of 2021 globally, taking home an estimated $65.8 million sum.

Track listing
All tracks are written by Taylor Swift and produced by Swift and Christopher Rowe, unless noted otherwise.

Notes
 signifies vocal producer

Notes
 Tracks 1–20 and 27 are noted as "Taylor's Version".
 Tracks 21–26 are noted as "From the Vault" on physical editions, and "(Taylor's Version) (From the Vault)" on digital editions of the album.
 The album's CD package consists of two discs; one containing tracks 1–13, and the other with tracks 14–27.
Track 27 is only included on the physical CD release.
The more fearless (taylors version) chapter includes if this was a movie (taylors version)

Personnel 
Credits adapted from Tidal.

Musicians

 Taylor Swift – lead vocals, songwriting, production (all tracks), background vocals (11, 14–16, 27)
 Mike Meadows – 12-string acoustic guitar (1), acoustic guitar (1–3, 5–8, 10–15, 17–19), background vocals (1, 3–5, 9–11, 17–19), Hammond B3 (1, 4), mandolin (1–3, 6–8, 15, 18–20), banjo (3, 6, 8, 10, 14, 17, 19, 20), finger clicking (4), piano (7, 10), electric guitar (9, 10), synthesizer (13, 16), synthesizer programming (13, 16), dobro (19)
 Caitlin Evanson – background vocals (1–4, 6, 8, 13)
 Paul Sidoti – background vocals (1, 3, 8, 11), electric guitar (1–3, 6, 8, 10, 11, 13, 14, 17–20), piano (5, 9, 10, 16), acoustic guitar (7)
 Amos Heller – bass (1–15, 17–20)
 Matt Billingslea – drums (1–15, 17–20), finger clicking (4), drum programming (6, 11, 14), electronic percussion (19, 20)
 Max Berstein – electric guitar (1–3, 7, 9–11, 13, 14, 18, 19), vibraphone (4), steel guitar (6, 8, 17), synthesizer (15, 16, 18, 20), synthesizer programming (15, 16, 20), banjo (20), glockenspiel (20)
 Jonathan Yudkin – fiddle (1, 3, 4, 6, 8, 11, 14), cello (2), strings (5, 7, 9, 10, 16, 17)
 Christopher Rowe – production (1–20), background vocals (2, 8, 10, 17, 20), vocal production (27)
 Liz Rose – songwriting (1, 5, 6, 8, 17, 18, 23, 26)
 Hillary Lindsey – songwriting (1)
 Dan Burns – drum programming (6, 11, 14), synthesizer programming (13, 15, 16, 20), electronic percussion (19, 20)
 Colbie Caillat – vocals, songwriting (7)
 Brian Pruitt – drum programming (8)
 John Rich – songwriting (10)
 Cary Barlowe – songwriting (15)
 Nathan Barlowe – songwriting (15)
 Tommy Lee James – songwriting (15, 25)
 Aaron Dessner – production, acoustic guitar, bass, drum programming, electric guitar, keyboards, percussion, synthesizer (21, 23), piano (21)
 Eric Slick – drums (21, 23)
 Josh Kaufman – electric guitar, harmonica (21), acoustic guitar, lap steel guitar (23)
 Maren Morris – vocals (21)
 Scooter Carusoe – songwriting (21)
 Jack Antonoff – production (22, 24–26), acoustic guitar (22, 24), background vocals (22, 25), bass (22, 24, 26), electric guitar (22, 24–26), percussion (22, 24, 26), keyboards (22, 25), programming (22, 25, 26), synthesizer (22), drums (24, 25), synthesizer programming (25), piano (26)
 Sean Hutchinson – drums (22, 24, 26)
 Mikey Freedom Hart – electric guitar (22, 24–26), pedal steel (22, 24), 12-string acoustic guitar (22), bass (24, 25), celesta (24), drums (24), Hammond B3 (24), keyboards (24, 25), piano (24, 26), percussion (25, 26), Rhodes (25), Wurlitzer organ (26)
 Michael Riddleberger – percussion (22, 24, 26)
 Evan Smith – saxophone (22, 24, 26), flute (24–26), percussion, strings, synthesizer programming (25)
 Keith Urban – background vocals, electric guitar (23), 12-string acoustic guitar, vocals (24)
 Clarice Jensen – cello (23)
 Brad Warren – songwriting (24)
 Brett Warren – songwriting (24)
 Bobby Hawk – violin (25, 26)
 Elvira Anderfjärd – production, remixing, background vocals, bass, drums, keyboards, programming (27)

Technical

 Taylor Swift – executive producer
 Randy Merrill – masters engineering (all tracks)
 Serban Ghenea – mixing (1–20, 22, 24–27)
 John Hanes – engineering (1–20, 22, 24–27)
 Christopher Rowe – vocal engineering (1, 6–26), recording engineering (2, 3)
 David Payne – recording engineering (1–20)
 Sam Holland – vocal engineering (3–5, 27)
 Bella Blasko – engineering, recording engineering (21, 23)
 Aaron Dessner – engineering, recording engineering (21, 23)
 Jonathan Low – mixing, engineering (21, 23)
 Julian Burg – vocal engineering (21)
 Greg Kurstin – vocal engineering (21)
 Jack Antonoff – recording engineering (22, 24–26)
 Laura Sisk – recording engineering (22, 24–26)
 Nick Rowse – vocal engineering (23, 24)
 Jon Gautier – recording engineering (25, 26)
 Mike Williams – recording engineering (25, 26)
 Elvira Anderfjärd – recording engineering (27)
 Lowell Reynolds – additional engineering, assistant recording engineering (1, 4–20)
 Derek Garten – additional engineering (1, 4–20)
 Sean Badum – assistant recording engineering (3)
 John Rooney – assistant recording engineering (24–26)
 Jon Sher – assistant recording engineering (24–26)

Charts

Weekly charts

Year-end charts

Certifications

Release history

See also
 List of Billboard 200 number-one albums of 2021
 List of UK Albums Chart number ones of the 2020s
 List of UK Album Downloads Chart number ones of the 2020s
 List of number-one albums of 2021 (Ireland)
 List of number-one albums of 2021 (Scotland)
 List of number-one albums of 2021 (Australia)
 List of number-one albums from the 2020s (New Zealand)
 List of number-one albums of 2021 (Canada)
 This Sweet Old World, an earlier country re-recording by singer-songwriter Lucinda Williams

Footnote

References

External links
 

2021 albums
Albums produced by Taylor Swift
Albums produced by Aaron Dessner
Albums produced by Jack Antonoff
Country albums by American artists
Country pop albums
Republic Records albums
Taylor Swift albums
Albums produced by Chris Rowe